Austrotrophon is a genus of sea snails, marine gastropod mollusks in the family Muricidae, the murex snails or rock snails.

Species
Species within the genus Austrotrophon include:

 Austrotrophon catalinensis (Oldroyd, 1927)
 Austrotrophon cerrosensis (Dall, 1891)
 Austrotrophon pinnata (Dall, 1902)

References

Ocenebrinae